Jock Stewart may refer to:
Jock Stewart, traditional Irish or Scottish music hall song also known as I'm a Man You Don't Meet Every Day
Jock Stewart, a fictional character from the Australian television series Prisoner, played by Tommy Dysart
John Stewart (New Zealand politician) (1902–1973), also known as Jock Stewart, New Zealand politician
Robert Leslie Stewart (1918–1989), also known as Jock Stewart, Scottish hangman
William Stewart (cyclist) (1883–1950), also known as Jock Stewart, a British Olympic cyclist